The Rural Municipality of Tecumseh No. 65 is a rural municipality (RM) in the Canadian province of Saskatchewan within Census Division No. 1 and  Division No. 1. It is located in the southeast portion of the province.

History
The RM of Tecumseh No. 65 incorporated as a rural municipality on December 13, 1909.

Geography

Communities and localities
The following urban municipalities are surrounded by the RM.

Towns
Stoughton

Villages
Forget
Heward

Demographics

Government
The RM of Tecumseh No. 65 is governed by an elected municipal council and an appointed administrator that meets on the first Wednesday of every month. The reeve of the RM is Zandra Slater while its administrator is Alysson Slater. The RM's office is located in Stoughton.

References

External links

 
Tecumseh
Division No. 1, Saskatchewan